Deni may refer to:
 Deni language
 Deni (дени), 1/100 of a Macedonian denar
 Department of Education (Northern Ireland)
 Deni (weightlifter), Indonesian weightlifter
 Viktor Deni (1893–1946), Russian satirist, cartoonist and poster artist
 Deni Avdija (born 2001), Israeli professional basketball player

See also
Denny (disambiguation)